The Teatro del Giglio (Theater of the Giglio) is the historic city theater and opera house located in Piazza del Giglio #13 and #15 in the center of Lucca, region of Tuscany, Italy.

History
The prior Teatro Pubblico (Public Theater), inaugurated in 1675, which had been destroyed by a fire and rebuilt. After the Napoleonic upheavals, the site had fallen to ruin. A new theater, represented by this Neoclassical-style structure, was built at the site in 1818 by Giovanni Lazzarini. The rusticated portico is surmounted by a balustrade upholding pilasters, that lead to a tympanum with the coat of arms of the city. The frieze reads Teatro Comunale del Giglio.

The name giglio or lily derives from the fleur-de-lis emblem, that was part of the Bourbon heraldic shield of the reigning duchess, Maria Luisa of the House of Bourbon. In the early 19th century, the interiors were painted by Luigi Gatani, while the theater curtain was painted by Federico Tarquini.

During the 19th century, the theater underwent updating, adding gas lighting in 1872, and electric lights in 1911. It was closed for two years during World War War I. A major refurbishment took place in the 1980s. A statue of Garibaldi stands in the square in front of the theater.
.

Actors and directors 
Nicola Fanucchi actor and director
Eros Pagni actor

References

Buildings and structures in Lucca
Commercial buildings completed in 1818
1675 establishments in Italy
1818 establishments in Italy
Opera houses in Italy
Theatres in Tuscany
19th-century architecture in Italy